The Sylheti or Sylhetis are an Indo-Aryan ethnocultural group that are associated with the Sylhet region in South Asia, specifically in northeast of Bengal, which is mostly located in the Sylhet Division of Bangladesh while a small part is in the Barak Valley of Assam, India. There are also sizeable Sylheti populations in the rest of Bangladesh, the United Kingdom and in parts of Northeast India.

Sylheti identity is associated mainly with regional culture and language, while accompanied with an ethnic Bengali identity and a national identity.

History
In September 1874, the British East India Company made Sylhet district a part of the non-regulation Chief Commissioner's Province of Assam (Northeast Frontier Province) for commercial development. The transfer led to the natives of Sylhet protesting against the British viceroy Lord Northbrook as they viewed themselves as a part of the Bengali people, and distinct from the Assamese. Leaders of both the Hindu and Muslim communities submitted a memorandum to Northbrook on 10 August 1874. Northbrook was eventually able to convince the people of Sylhet by assuring them that education and justice will still be administered under Bengal, and highlighting the economic opportunity for Sylhetis in Assam's tea industry. With the approach of the independence movement towards 1920, Sylhetis began forming organisations such as the Sylhet Peoples' Association and Sylhet-Bengal Reunion League which demanded Sylhet to be reincorporated to Bengal.

Culture

Sylheti folklore is influenced by Hindu, Sufi, Turco-Persian and native ideas. Chandra Kumar De of Mymensingh is known to be the first researcher of Sylheti folklore. Archives of old works are kept in Kendriya Muslim Sahitya Sangsad in Sylhet (also known as the Sylhet Central Muslim Literary Society) – the oldest literary organisation in Bengal and one of the oldest in the subcontinent.

Literature
It has been argued that the first Bengali translation of the Mahabharata was written by Sri Sanjay of Sylhet in the 17th century. The 18th-century Hattanather Panchali (Hattanath chronicles) written by Ganesh Ram Shiromani was a Bengali ballad of 36,000 lines which detail the early history of Sylhet though its authenticity is questionable. When Sylhet was under the rule of the Twipra Kingdom, medieval Sylheti writers using the Bengali script included the likes of Dwija Pashupati, the author of Chandravali – considered one of the earliest Sylheti works. Nasiruddin Haydar of Sylhet town wrote the Tawarikh-e-Jalali, the first Bengali biography of Shah Jalal. Gobind Gosai of Masulia wrote Nirbban Shongit, Gopinath Dutta wrote Dronporbbo, Dotto Bongshaboli and Nariporbbo and Nur Ali Khan of Syedpur wrote Marifoti Geet. Songwriters and poets such as Radharaman Dutta, Hason Raja and  Shah Abdul Karim, significantly contributed to Bengali literature and their works remain popular across Bengal in present-times. Numerous Bengali writers emerged in Ita, such as Kobi Muzaffar Khan, Gauri Shankar Bhatta and Golok Chand Ghosh. Muslim literature was based upon historical affairs and biographies of prominent Islamic figures. Like the rest of Muslim Bengal, Bengali Muslim poetry was written in a colloquial dialect of Bengali which came to be known as Dobhashi, and has had a major influence on Sylheti. Dobhashi featured the use of Perso-Arabic vocabulary in Bengali texts. A separate script was developed in Sylhet for this popular linguistic register. Known as the Sylheti Nagri script, its most renowned writer was Sadeq Ali whose Halatunnabi was famed as household item amongst rural Muslim communities. Manuscripts have been found of works such as Rag Namah by Fazil Nasim Muhammad, Shonabhaner Puthi by Abdul Karim, and the earliest known work Talib Huson (1549) by Gholam Huson. Late Nagri writers include Muhammad Haidar Chaudhuri who wrote Ahwal-i-Zamana in 1907 and Muhammad Abdul Latif who wrote Pohela Kitab o Doikhurar Rag in 1930. In 2021, Shuvagoto Chowdhury was awarded the Bangla Academy Literary Award.

Other languages

Sylhetis have contributed to Sanskrit literature throughout history. In the 15th century, Jagadish Tarkalankar wrote several Sanskrit books, many of which were made up of numerous volumes. Tarlankar's Shabdashaktiprakashika was a famous textbook for Sanskrit learners.  His contemporary, Advaita Acharya of Laur, wrote two medieval Sanskrit books, Yogabashishta-Bhaishta and Geeta Bhaishya. In the 16th century, Murari Gupta wrote the first Sanskrit biography of Chaitanya Mahaprabhu and Raghunath Shiromani wrote 40 books in Sanskrit. Some works written by Sylhetis have also been translated into other languages. For example, Ashraf Hussain's Manipurer Ladai was translated into English by Dinesh Chandra Sen and included in the Eastern Bengal Ballads.

Sylhet, in particular the Taraf, was also an esteemed centre for the study of Persian, an official language up until the British period, due to the high population of foreign missionaries from Central Asia and Persia following the Conquest of Sylhet. Ma'dan al-Fawaid was written in 1534 by Syed Shah Israil who is considered to be Sylhet's first author. Other prominent writers include Muhammad Arshad, Syed Rayhan ad-Din and Syed Pir Badshah. Reyazuddin of Taraf wrote a Persian book on "Dream Fruit". Ala Bakhsh Mazumdar Hamed was known to have written Tuhfatul Muhsineen and Diwan-i-Hamed. Collectively, the works of these two people belonging to the Mazumdar family of Sylhet, are regarded amongst the most creative literary works in the Sylhet region. Majid Bakht Mazumdar wrote an English book on the family history.

In the 19th century, Urdu had a somewhat aristocratic background in Sylhet and notable families that spoke it included the Nawabs of Longla and the Mazumdars of Sylhet. Moulvi Hamid Bakht Mazumdar, who was also fluent in Persian, wrote the Urdu prose Ain-i-Hind, a history of the Indian subcontinent. Literature written in this period included Nazir Muhammad Abdullah Ashufta's Tanbeeh al-Ghafileen, written in 1894, and the poems of Moulvi Farzam Ali Bekhud of Baniachong. Hakim Ashraf Ali Mast and Fida Sylheti were prominent Urdu poets of Sylhet in the 19th century, the latter being a disciple of Agha Ahmad Ali. In 1946, the Anjuman-i Taraqqi-i Urdu performed a mushaira in Sylhet attracting the likes of Hafeez Jalandhari, the lyricist of the National Anthem of Pakistan.

Distribution

Barak Valley
The Barak Valley consists of three districts in the Indian state of Assam, which are home to a Bengali-speaking majority population as opposed to Assamese. Geographically the region is surrounded by hills from all three sides except its western plain boundary with Bangladesh.Though not a part of Sylhet in present times, the Barak Valley hosts the presence of the same Sylheti dialect. Niharranjan Ray, author of Bangalir Itihash, claims that "South Assam / Northeastern Bengal or Barak Valley is the extension of the Greater Surma/Meghna Valley of Bengal in every aspect from culture to geography".

A movement emerged in the 1960s in this Sylheti-majority area of India. Referred to as the Bengali Language Movement of the Barak Valley, Sylhetis protested against the decision of the Government of Assam to make Assamese the only sole official language of the state knowing full well that 80% of the Barak Valley people are Bengalis. The main incident took place on 19 May 1961 at Silchar railway station in which 11 Sylheti-Bengalis were killed by the Assamese police. Sachindra Chandra Pal and Kamala Bhattacharya were two notable Sylheti students murdered by the Assam Rifles during the movement.

Diaspora

Lord Cornwallis introduced the Permanent Settlement Act of Bengal in 1793 and it altered the social, political and economic landscape of the Sylhet region; socioeconomic ramification for former landlords was severe as the land changed hands. On juxtapose, colonial administration opened new windows of opportunities for young men, who sought employment merchant ship companies. Young men from Sylhet boarded ships primarily at Kolkata, Mumbai and Singapore. Many Sylheti people believed that seafaring was a historical and cultural inheritance due to a large proportion of Sylheti Muslims being descended from foreign traders, lascars and businessman from the Middle East and Central Asia who migrated to the Sylhet region before and after the Conquest of Sylhet. Kasa Miah, who was a Sylheti migrant, claimed this was a very encouraging factor for Sylhetis to travel to Calcutta aiming to eventually reach the United States and United Kingdom. By virtue of Magna Carta Libertatum, Sylhetis could enter and settle Britain freely (while a declaration of intent was required to enter the US). Diaspora patterns indicate a strong connection between Sylheti diaspora and the movement of Sylheti seamen.

Today, the Sylheti diaspora numbers around one million, mainly concentrated in the United Kingdom, United States, Canada, Germany, Italy, France, Australia, Portugal, Spain, Sweden, Finland and the Middle East and other European countries. However, a 2008 study showed that 95% of Sylheti diaspora live in the UK. In the United States, most Sylhetis live in New York City, though sizeable populations also live in Atlanta, Houston, Los Angeles, Miami, and Detroit.

Some argue that remittances sent from Sylheti diaspora around the world back to Bangladesh have negatively affected development in Bangladesh, where a lack of government initiatives has caused economic inertia.

According to neo-classical theory, the poorest would move to the richest countries and those from densely populated areas would move to more sparsely populated regions. This has clearly not been the case. The brain drain was a movement from core to core, purely on economic maximisation, while it was young Sylheti pioneers with access to financial resources that migrated from a severely overpopulated Bangladesh to the overcrowded streets of Spitalfields, poorest from all parts of Bangladesh migrated to Sylhet for a better life, causing a severe overcrowding and scarcity of resources in Sylhet.

Religion

Sunni Islam is the largest denomination with majority following the Hanafi school of law. There are significant numbers of people who follow Sufi ideals, although the revivalist Deobandi movement is also popular with many being a part of the Tablighi Jamaat. During the British colonial period, Wahhabism was adopted by some upper-class families in Sylhet. There is a very small minority of Shia Muslims who gather every year during Ashura for the Mourning of Muharram processions. Places of procession include the Prithimpasha Nawab Bari in Kulaura, home to a Shia family, as well as Balaganj, Osmani Nagar and Rajtila.

Hinduism is the second largest religion amongst Sylhetis. Other minority religions include Christianity and there was a presence of Sikhism after Guru Nanak's visit to Sylhet in 1508 to spread the religion and build a gurdwara there. This Gurdwara was visited twice by Tegh Bahadur and many hukamnamas were issued to this temple in Sylhet by Guru Gobind Singh. In 1897, the gurdwara collapsed after the earthquake.

Notables

Popular modern writers and poets from the region include Abdur Rouf Choudhury, Dilwar Khan and Chowdhury Gulam Akbar. Muhammad Mojlum Khan is a non-fiction writer best known for writing the English biographical dictionary, The Muslim 100. Prominent Bengali language non-fiction writers include Syed Murtaza Ali, Syed Mujtaba Ali, Dewan Mohammad Azraf, Abed Chaudhury, Achyut Charan Choudhury, Arun Kumar Chanda, Asaddor Ali, Ashraf Hussain and Dwijen Sharma.

Cricket and football are the most popular sports amongst Sylhetis. Many Sylheti cricketers have played for the Bangladesh national cricket team such as Alok Kapali, Enamul Haque Jr, Nazmul Hossain, Rajin Saleh and Tapash Baisya. Beanibazar SC is the only Sylheti club which as qualified for the Bangladesh League and Alfaz Ahmed was a Sylheti who played for the Bangladesh national football team. Hamza Choudhury is the first Bangladeshi to play in the Premier League and is predicted to be the first British Asian to play for the England national football team. Bulbul Hussain was the first breakthrough Sylheti professional wheelchair rugby player. Rani Hamid is one of the most successful chess players in the world, winning championships in Asia and Europe multiple times. Ramnath Biswas was a revolutionary soldier who embarked on three world tours on a bicycle in the 19th century.

See also
 History of Sylhet
 Lascar (novel)
 World Sylhet Convention

Citations

General and cited references
 
 

Indo-Aryan peoples
Asian diasporas
Bangladeshi diaspora
Sylhet Division
Ethnic groups in Bangladesh
Ethnic groups in India